Satılmış Adam (English: Sold Man) is a 1976 Turkish political thriller action film directed by Remzi Aydın Jöntürk, the second piece of his Adam Trilogy. It comes after Yarınsız Adam (Man Without Tomorrow) of 1976 and before Yıkılmayan Adam (Indestructible Man) of 1977. It stars Cüneyt Arkın, Perihan Savaş and Nejat Özbek.

Cast

References

External links
 

1976 films
1970s Turkish-language films
1970s action drama films
Films set in Turkey
Turkish sequel films
1970s vigilante films
Political action films
1970s crime action films
Films about organized crime in Turkey
Turkish vigilante films
1976 drama films